Norman Goff (11 May 1921 – 11 September 1989) was an Australian sports shooter. He competed in the 300 metre rifle event at the 1956 Summer Olympics.

References

1921 births
1989 deaths
Australian male sport shooters
Olympic shooters of Australia
Shooters at the 1956 Summer Olympics
Sportspeople from Geelong
20th-century Australian people